The Farnam Hotel is a 255 ft (78 m), 15-story skyscraper at the corner of South 13th and Farnam Streets in Downtown Omaha, Nebraska, United States. It was built in 1990 as an office building and was formerly known as 1200 Landmark Center, at one point housing the Omaha operations of Pacific Life. The hotel opened on May 20, 2021.

See also
 Economy of Omaha, Nebraska
 List of tallest buildings in Omaha, Nebraska

References

External links
 The Farnam Hotel official website

Skyscraper office buildings in Omaha, Nebraska
Downtown Omaha, Nebraska
Office buildings completed in 1990
Holabird & Root
Hotels established in 2021]
Hotel buildings completed in 1990